Probable ATP-dependent RNA helicase DDX47 is an enzyme that in humans is encoded by the DDX47 gene.

This gene encodes a member of the DEAD box protein family. DEAD box proteins, characterized by the conserved motif Asp-Glu-Ala-Asp (DEAD), are putative RNA helicases. They are implicated in a number of cellular processes involving alteration of RNA secondary structure, such as translation initiation, nuclear and mitochondrial splicing, and ribosome and spliceosome assembly. Based on their distribution patterns, some members of this family are believed to be involved in embryogenesis, spermatogenesis, and cellular growth and division. The protein encoded by this gene can shuttle between the nucleus and the cytoplasm, and has an RNA-independent ATPase activity. Two alternatively spliced transcript variants encoding distinct isoforms have been found for this gene.

References

Further reading